The 2005 Special Olympics Winter World Games were hosted at Nagano in Nippon and were the first Special Olympics World Games held in Asia. Nagano became the first city in the world to host the Olympics, Paralympics and Special Olympics World Games.

Events 
Floor hockey
Figure skating
Speed skating
Snowshoe
Cross-country skiing
Snowboarding
Alpine skiing

Venues 
M-Wave – the opening, closing ceremonies and Speed skating
Big Hat – Figure skating
White Ring – Floor hockey
Yamanouchi – Alpine skiing
Hakuba – Cross-country
Nozawaonsen – Snowshoe
Mure – Snowboarding

See also 
1998 Winter Olympics
1998 Winter Paralympics

External links 
2005 Winter Special Olympics at Shinano Mainichi Shimbun
2005 Special Olympics World Winter Games

Special Olympics World Summer Games
Special
International sports competitions hosted by Japan
Special Olympics
Sports competitions in Nagano (city)
Multi-sport events in Japan